Nephila komaci is a species of golden orb-web spider. It is the largest web-spinning spider known. A few specimens have been found in South Africa and Madagascar.

Discovery
This species was first identified in a Pretoria museum collection in 2000. The species is named in honor of Andrej Komac, a late friend of one of the arachnologists  who reported its discovery in 2009. It was not discovered in the wild until 2007, when it was located in Tembe Elephant Park in South Africa.

It was one of the first new Nephila spiders to be discovered in more than a century; most were discovered in the 19th century.

Description
N. komaci females are the largest Nephila yet discovered. Displaying sexual size dimorphism commonly observed in various species of spiders, the size of a male reaches a leg span of only about 2.5 centimetres, with a body length of about 9 mm, roughly one fifth of that of a female.  The tip-to-tip leg span of a female is about 12 cm (body length c. 4 cm), with a web that is equally impressive in size, measuring more than a metre in diameter.

Reproduction
Males wait for a female to molt, and immediately afterwards inseminate her, breaking off their genitalia within the female, which thereby acts as a plug to prevent other males from mating with her. The now sterile male then spends the rest of his life (life span: about one year) driving away other males. Nevertheless, females with several dismembered male organs within them have been found.

Distribution
All known localities lie within two endangered biodiversity hotspots: Maputaland-Pondoland-Albany and Madagascar.  Its only definitive current habitat is a sand forest in Tembe Elephant Park, which is in itself endangered.

References

External links 
 

Araneidae
Spiders of Africa
Spiders described in 2009